Habib Ayyoub (real name Abdelaziz Benmahdjoub, born 15 October 1947 in Takdempt) is an Algerian writer, journalist, and film-maker, notable for his novels in French.  He lives in Dellys.

Biography 

After studying sociology, then filmmaking at the INSAS in Brussels, he became a correspondent of Le Jeune Indépendant, then economic journalist at Liberté.

He then made a few short films before going on to publish his first books: Le Désert et après and Le Gardien (published by Barzakh Editions) in 2002. Le Gardien tells the story of a soldier posted to a remote settlement in the desert.

Two of his works have been translated into Italian: Il guardiano (Le gardien) and Il regolatore di orologi (Le remonteur d'horloge).

References

External links 
 DZLit: Habib Ayyoub
 Le remonteur d’horloge de Habib Ayyoub : un récit absurde ? (Siham Benniche, MA thesis, University of Bejaia 2015)

1947 births
20th-century Algerian writers
21st-century Algerian writers
Algerian filmmakers
Algerian people
People from Dellys
People from Dellys District
People from Boumerdès Province
Kabyle people
Algerian novelists
Algerian journalists
Living people